The 1980 Lynda Carter Classic was a women's tennis tournament played on outdoor hard courts at the Deer Creek Racquet Club in Deerfield Beach, Florida in the United States that was part of the Colgate Series of the 1980 Avon Championships World Championship Series. It was the inaugural edition of the tournament and was held from October 13 through October 19, 1980. First-seeded Chris Evert-Lloyd won the singles title at the event and earned $20,000 first-prize money.

Finals

Singles
 Chris Evert-Lloyd defeated  Andrea Jaeger 6–4, 6–1
 It was Evert-Lloyd's 7th singles title of the year and the 100th of her career.

Doubles
 Andrea Jaeger /  Regina Maršíková defeated  Martina Navratilova /  Candy Reynolds 1–6, 6–1, 6–2
 It was Jaeger's 2nd doubles title of the year and of her career. It was Maršíková's 2nd doubles title of the year and the 6th of her career

Prize money

References

External links
 International Tennis Federation (ITF) tournament edition details

Lynda Carter Maybelline Classic
Maybelline Classic
Lynda Carter Classic
Lynda Carter Classic
Lynda Carter Classic